MAX-3SAT is a problem in the computational complexity subfield of computer science.  It generalises the Boolean satisfiability problem (SAT) which is a decision problem considered in complexity theory.  It is defined as:

Given a 3-CNF formula Φ (i.e. with at most 3 variables per clause), find an assignment that satisfies the largest number of clauses.

MAX-3SAT is a canonical complete problem for the complexity class MAXSNP (shown complete in Papadimitriou pg. 314).

Approximability 

The decision version of MAX-3SAT is NP-complete.  Therefore, a polynomial-time solution can only be achieved if P = NP.  An approximation within a factor of 2 can be achieved with this simple algorithm, however:

 Output the solution in which most clauses are satisfied, when either all variables = TRUE or all variables = FALSE.
 Every clause is satisfied by one of the two solutions, therefore one solution satisfies at least half of the clauses.

The Karloff-Zwick algorithm runs in polynomial-time and satisfies ≥ 7/8 of the clauses.

Theorem 1 (inapproximability) 

The PCP theorem implies that there exists an ε > 0 such that (1-ε)-approximation of MAX-3SAT is NP-hard.

Proof:

Any NP-complete problem  by the PCP theorem.  For x ∈ L, a 3-CNF formula Ψx is constructed so that

 x ∈ L ⇒ Ψx is satisfiable
 x ∉ L ⇒ no more than (1-ε)m clauses of Ψx are satisfiable.

The Verifier V reads all required bits at once i.e. makes non-adaptive queries.  This is valid because the number of queries remains constant.

 Let q be the number of queries.
 Enumerating all random strings Ri ∈ V, we obtain poly(x) strings since the length of each string .
 For each Ri
 V chooses q positions i1,...,iq and a Boolean function fR: {0,1}q->{0,1} and accepts if and only if fR(π(i1,...,iq)).  Here π refers to the proof obtained from the Oracle.

Next we try to find a Boolean formula to simulate this.  We introduce Boolean variables x1,...,xl, where l is the length of the proof.  To demonstrate that the Verifier runs in Probabilistic polynomial-time, we need a correspondence between the number of satisfiable clauses and the probability the Verifier accepts.

 For every R, add clauses representing fR(xi1,...,xiq) using 2q SAT clauses.  Clauses of length q are converted to length 3 by adding new (auxiliary) variables e.g. x2 ∨ x10 ∨ x11 ∨ x12 = ( x2 ∨ x10 ∨ yR) ∧ ( R ∨ x11 ∨ x12).  This requires a maximum of q2q 3-SAT clauses.
 If z ∈ L then
 there is a proof π such that Vπ (z) accepts for every Ri.
 All clauses are satisfied if xi = π(i) and the auxiliary variables are added correctly.
 If input z ∉ L then
 For every assignment to x1,...,xl and yR's, the corresponding proof π(i) = xi causes the Verifier to reject for half of all R ∈ {0,1}r(|z|).
 For each R, one clause representing fR fails.
 Therefore, a fraction  of clauses fails.

It can be concluded that if this holds for every NP-complete problem then the PCP theorem must be true.

Theorem 2 

Håstad  demonstrates a tighter result than Theorem 1 i.e. the best known value for ε.

He constructs a PCP Verifier for 3-SAT that reads only 3 bits from the Proof.
<blockquote>
For every ε > 0, there is a PCP-verifier M for 3-SAT that reads a random string r of length  and computes query positions ir, jr, kr in the proof π and a bit br.  It accepts if and only if 'π(ir) ⊕ π(jr) ⊕ π(kr) = br.</blockquote>
The Verifier has completeness (1−ε) and soundness 1/2 + ε (refer to PCP (complexity)).  The Verifier satisfies

If the first of these two equations were equated to "=1" as usual, one could find a proof π by solving a system of linear equations (see MAX-3LIN-EQN) implying P = NP.

 If z ∈ L, a fraction ≥ (1 − ε) of clauses are satisfied.
 If z ∉ L, then for a (1/2 − ε) fraction of R, 1/4 clauses are contradicted.

This is enough to prove the hardness of approximation ratio

 Related problems  

MAX-3SAT(B) is the restricted special case of MAX-3SAT where every variable occurs in at most B clauses. Before the PCP theorem was proven, Papadimitriou and Yannakakis showed that for some fixed constant B, this problem is MAX SNP-hard. Consequently, with the PCP theorem, it is also APX-hard. This is useful because MAX-3SAT(B) can often be used to obtain a PTAS-preserving reduction in a way that MAX-3SAT cannot. Proofs for explicit values of B include: all B ≥ 13,Sanjeev Arora, "Probabilistic Checking of Proofs and Hardness of Approximation Problems," Revised version of a dissertation submitted at CS Division, U C Berkeley, in August 1994. CS-TR-476-94. Section 7.2. and all B ≥ 3 (which is best possible).

Moreover, although the decision problem 2SAT is solvable in polynomial time, MAX-2SAT(3) is also APX-hard.

The best possible approximation ratio for MAX-3SAT(B), as a function of B, is at least  and at most , unless NP=RP. Some explicit bounds on the approximability constants for certain values of B are known.

 Berman, Karpinski and Scott proved that for the "critical" instances of MAX-3SAT in which each literal occurs exactly twice, and each clause is exactly of size 3, the problem is approximation hard for some constant factor.

MAX-EkSAT is a parameterized version of MAX-3SAT where every clause has exactly  literals, for k'' ≥ 3.  It can be efficiently approximated with approximation ratio  using ideas from coding theory.

It has been proved that random instances of MAX-3SAT can be approximated to within factor .

References 

Lecture Notes from University of California, Berkeley
Coding theory notes at University at Buffalo

Satisfiability problems
NP-hard problems